Majeepura is a village in Shahpura tehsil, Jaipur district in Rajasthan.

References 

Villages in Jaipur district